Divisional general is a general officer rank who commands an army division. The rank originates from the French (Revolutionary) System, and is used by a number of countries.  The rank is above a brigade general, and normally below an army corps general.

The rank is mostly used in countries where it is used as a modern alternative to a previous older rank of major-general or lieutenant-general.

Specific countries

Brazil

The Brazilian rank general-de-divisão translates literally as "general of division", and is used by the army. This rank is equivalent to lieutenant-general. The air force equivalent is major-brigadeiro(literally "major-brigadier"). The navy equivalent is vice-almirante (literally, vice-admiral)

Chile
The Chilean rank general de división translates literally as "general of division", and is used by the army. This rank is equivalent to lieutenant-general. The air force equivalent is general de aviación (literally "aviation general"). These officers occupy positions such as Chief of the Joint Staff, Chief of the General Staff of the Army and commanders of high repartitions.

France

A French Army général de division translates as a "general of division". The French Air and Space Force equivalent is général de division aérienne (literally "general of air division"). Rank insignia is that of 3 white stars on the epaulette, sleeve mark or shoulder board. After World War II, the corresponding rank of divisional general was changed to major general, and before that it corresponded to lieutenant general.

As well as commanding a division, a général de division may be appointed as général de corps d'armée (a "corps general") commanding an army corps, or as a général d'armée (a "general of an army"), commanding a field army.  These are not ranks, but appointments of the same rank. The insignia of a général de corps d'armée is four stars in a diamond formation, and that of a général d'armée is five stars in a cross-shaped arrangement. The arrangement for the air force is the same, but the ranks are called général de corps d'armée aérien ("general of an air corps") and général d'armée aérienne ("general of an air army") respectively.

Général de division ayant un commandement supérieur 
 was unofficial rank used in World War I. At that time, general officers had a two-rank system in the France, so as a temporary measure, considering the personnel balance with general officer of other countries, a horizontal bar was attached to the top or bottom of the three-star on the kepi and sleeves of the Horizon blue. They were distinguished by wearing a rank insignia and were given status and treatment as full general.

Italy

The Italian army and Carabineer rank of generale di divisione translates as "divisional general". The air force equivalent is generale di divisione aerea (literally "general of air division").

The ordinary law n. 299, come into force on December 2, 2004, has restored the traditional ranks of Army Brigade General, Divisional General and Army corps general, which had been changed in 1997. Some general divisions wear a third functional star with red border, which indicates they are enrolled in a special responsibility or as deputy officials of their proximate superiors.

Poland

The Polish equivalent is generał dywizji (literally, "general of division"). The symbols of this rank are the general's wavy line and two stars, featured both on the rogatywka (the Polish peaked, four-pointed cap), on the sleeves of the uniform and above the breast pocket of a field uniform.

Spain

The Spanish rank general de división translates literally as "general of division", and is used by the army, the air force and the Guardia Civil.

Switzerland

The Swiss military use 4 languages, German, French, Romansh and Italian. The names of the OF-7 rank are divisionär (German); divisionnaire (French); divisiunari (Romansh); divisionario (Italian). In all cases, these are abbreviated as "Div", and in all cases represent the head of a division, and hence can be translated as "divisional general".

Serbia and Yugoslavia

There was a proposition in 1898 by HM King Alexander I to introduce the rank of divisional general (Дивизијски ђенерал) to the Royal Serbian Army, along with brigade general and army general.

The newly created Royal Yugoslav Army introduced the rank of divisional general in 1923 and confirmed by law in 1929, modeled after French army, as the second general rank, higher than brigade general but lower than army general. The rank had a similar role as the French général de division at time of introduction, able to command a corps, as there was no separate rank for corps command. This rank was also used during World War II by the Chetniks. The most notable holders are Miroslav Trifunović and Ivan Prezelj. These ranks were replaced in 1945 by Tito's Yugoslav Partisans with the introduction of Soviet-style ranks.

Divisional general's insignia

See also
 Divisional admiral

References

Bibliography
 

Military ranks
General de division
Military ranks of Poland